Callipolis is the Latinized form of Kallipolis (Καλλίπολις), which is Greek for "beautiful city", from κάλλος kallos (beauty) and πόλις polis (city). It was the name of several ancient cities, notably:
 Callipolis (Aetolia), town of ancient Aetolia, Greece
 Callipolis (Caria), town of ancient Caria, Asia Minor
 Callipolis (Mysia), town of ancient Mysia, Asia Minor
 a peninsula in the Thracian Chersonesus, modern Gallipoli
 Gallipoli, Apulia (Kallipolis) in Apulia, southern Italy, a port on a peninsula into the Tarentine Gulf
 Callipolis (Thrace), a port on the Hellespont, the modern Gelibolu, Turkey
a titular bishopric, Gelibolu#Bishopric; i.e., the  
 Kallipolis (Plato), the utopian city-state ruled by a philosopher-king, presented by Socrates in Plato's dialogue The Republic
 Some historians believe that there was an ancient Greek colony, named Kallipolis, at the place of modern Barcelona, Spain; see History of Barcelona

Greek mythology 
 Callipolis, son of Alcathous, son of Pelops

See also 
 Gallipoli (disambiguation)